Bandhu (Bengali: বন্ধু) (English: Friend) is a 2007 Bengali film directed by Prashanta Nanda and produced by Kusum Dhanuka. The film features actors Prosenjit Chatterjee and Swastika Mukherjee in the lead roles. Music of the film has been composed by Prashanta Nanda and Shanti Raj

Cast 
 Prosenjit Chatterjee as Devshankar Roy
 Swastika Mukherjee as Aditi Roy ( née Chowdhury )
 Victor Banerjee
 Rajatava Dutta
 Soma Banerjee
 Dola Chowdhury
 Shyamal Dutta
 Nayana Das
 Tithi Bose

Soundtrack

Reception

References

External links

Bengali-language Indian films
2007 films
2000s Bengali-language films
Films directed by Prashanta Nanda